Gattorno is a surname. Notable people with the surname include:

Antonio Gattorno (1904-1980), Cuban painter
Francisco Gattorno (born 1964), Cuban-Mexican actor
Jorge L. Sicre-Gattorno (born 1958), Cuban-American painter
Rosa Maria Benedetta Gattorno Custo (1831–1900), Italian Roman Catholic nun